Doug or Douglas(s) Bailey may refer to:

Political figures
Doug Bailey (1933–2013), American Republican political consultant and philanthropist
Doug Bailey (born 1962), mayor of Cypress, California
Douglas Bailey, English political activist, unsuccessful in Newham London Borough Council election, 2010

Others
Douglas Carr Bailey (1915–1977), Scottish architect and town planner; completed Bevin Court
Doug Bailey (born 1948), American actor and writer, see (List of One Day at a Time episodes)
Father Douglas Bailey (born 1949), American Salvatorian Roman Catholic priest, chaplain at Newman Centers
Douglas A. Bailey (born 1958), American horticulturist and academic at University of Georgia College of Agricultural and Environmental Sciences
Doug Bailey (born 1960), Iowa radio personality for classic rock station KGGO
Douglass W. Bailey (born 1963), American anthropologist, archeologist and academic, on (Cucuteni-Trypillian culture)
Doug Bailey (footballer) (born 1971), Australian rules footballer

Fictional characters
Doug Bailey (played by John Wesley Shipp), husband of Kim's sister in TV series Drop Dead Diva

See also
Bailey (surname)